The list of people from the London Borough of Southwark includes residents who were either born or dwelt for a substantial period within the borders of this modern London borough.  It does not comprise notable individuals who only studied at educational institutions in the area, such as the Camberwell School of Art and the Dulwich College.  Several of the men and women listed have been honoured with blue plaques in various parts of the borough, including more than 50 commemorative plaques awarded by the Southwark Council since 2003.

In 1965, the Metropolitan Borough of Southwark, the Metropolitan Borough of Camberwell, and the Metropolitan Borough of Bermondsey were amalgamated to form the London Borough of Southwark. Located in the eastern part of South London, it is, along with the City of London, the oldest part of Greater London, with a history of civilisation that dates back to the Roman times.  One of the 32 London boroughs, it constitutes several urban and suburban neighborhoods, including Bermondsey, Bankside, Camberwell, Dulwich, Peckham, Nunhead, Rotherhithe, Walworth, and The Borough, located at the southern bank of the river Thames.

The 2001 census recorded the population of Southwark to be nearly 244,866 residents, sixty-three per cent of whom are whites, sixteen per cent black African and 8 percent black Caribbean.  For a decade, between 1997 and 2007, the borough's population grew at three times the rate of England as a whole.  Sixty per cent of the borough's inhabitants are currently known to live in social housing.

Notable residents
Key to "Notes" regarding the residents' affiliation to Southwark:

Citations in the Notes box refer to the information in the entire row.

Academia and research

Arts and entertainment

Engineering and technology

Journalism and media

Literature

Politics and government

Religion

Sports

See also
List of people from London

References

External links

Southwark
People from the London Borough of Southwark